Åse is a village in Andøy Municipality in Nordland county, Norway. The village is located along the Norwegian County Road 82 on the southeastern coast of the island of Andøya, along the Andfjorden.

References

Andøy
Villages in Nordland
Populated places of Arctic Norway